Jan Wypiorczyk (22 January 1947 – 8 November 2011) was a Polish wrestler who competed in the 1968 Summer Olympics and in the 1972 Summer Olympics. He was born in Łódź.

References

1947 births
2011 deaths
Olympic wrestlers of Poland
Wrestlers at the 1968 Summer Olympics
Wrestlers at the 1972 Summer Olympics
Polish male sport wrestlers
Sportspeople from Łódź